"Up There Down There" is a rock song written by Patti Smith and Fred "Sonic" Smith. It was released as the third single from Patti Smith's 1988 album Dream of Life.

Charts

Notes 

1988 singles
Patti Smith songs
Songs written by Patti Smith
Song recordings produced by Jimmy Iovine
1987 songs
Arista Records singles
Songs written by Fred "Sonic" Smith